Farell Ted Laurent (born January 1, 1988) is a Canadian football defensive lineman for Hamilton Tiger-Cats of the Canadian Football League (CFL).

College career
Laurent played college football for the Ole Miss Rebels.

Professional career

Edmonton Eskimos
Laurent was drafted in the second round in the 2011 CFL supplemental draft, costing the Edmonton Eskimos a second round draft choice in the 2012 CFL Draft. He signed with the team on June 2, 2011. In three seasons with the Eskimos, he played in 48 games where he recorded 65 defensive tackles, 11 sacks, and one force fumble. He became a free agent upon the expiry of his contract on February 11, 2014.

Hamilton Tiger-Cats
On June 1, 2014, Laurent signed with the Hamilton Tiger-Cats. In his first season with his new team, he had 22 defensive tackles, nine sacks, and one forced fumble. He was awarded the Lew Hayman Trophy in 2014 for being the most outstanding Canadian player in the East Division.

Personal life
Laurent was born to parents Farell and Yvette Laurent.

References

External links
Hamilton Tiger-Cats player bio 

1988 births
Living people
Canadian football defensive linemen
Edmonton Elks players
Hamilton Tiger-Cats players
Ole Miss Rebels football players
Players of Canadian football from Quebec
Canadian football people from Montreal